Eldbjørg Hemsing (born 16 February 1990 in Nord-Aurdal, Norway) is a Norwegian violinist who has been since the age of 11, with her solo debut with the Bergen Philharmonic Orchestra. She premiered several works by Tan Dun. She lives in Berlin. She is the younger sister of Norwegian violinist Ragnhild Hemsing.

Biography 
Eldbjørg Hemsing was born in Valdres, Norway in 1990. She started playing the violin at the age of five. By the age of six, Hemsing was playing violin for the Norwegian Royal Family. At the age of seven, she was accepted into the Barratt Due Institute of Music in Oslo where she received lessons from Alf Richard Kraggerud and Stephan Barratt-Due. Hemsing has also studied with Boris Kuschnir. In 2012, she performed at the Nobel Peace Prize Ceremony in Oslo.

A collaboration developed with the Oscar-winning composer and conductor Tan Dun, when he asked her to perform his Hero Concerto with the Netherlands Symphony Orchestra as well as with the MDR Leipzig Radio Symphony Orchestra. She premiered Tan Dun's Triple Resurrection Concerto in Leipzig and Shanghai with the Shanghai Philharmonic Orchestra. Hemsing also premiered Tan Dun's violin concerto The Love with the Trondheim Symphony Orchestra at the 2010 World Expo in Shanghai and most recently Tan Dun's violin concerto The Fire Rituals, a composition that was premiered with the Chinese National Orchestra at National Centre for the Performing Arts (China).

Hemsing played with the NDR Radiophilharmonie, RTÉ National Symphony Orchestra Ireland, Oslo Philharmonic Orchestra, Norwegian Radio Orchestra, Czech National Symphony Orchestra, and Hong Kong Philharmonic Orchestra. She has appeared at the Bad Kissingen and AlpenKlassik festivals in Germany, International Chamber Music Festivals in Oslo, Stavanger and Bergen, Wigmore Hall, Verbier Festival, Bellerive Festival, as well as at the Nordic Cool Festival at the Kennedy Center in Washington D.C.

Hemsing's recording of a violin concerto by Hjalmar Borgstrøm with Wiener Symphoniker, directed by Olari Elts, was released worldwide by BIS in 2018. Major appearances include performances with Norwegian Arctic Philharmonic Orchestra – conductor Christian Lindberg, Szczecin Philharmonic – conductor Rune Bergmann, Bergen International Festival in Norway, Paavo Järvi's Pärnu Festival in Estonia.

Hemsing organizes the Hemsing Festival with her sister.

Hemsing plays a GB Guadagnini violin from 1754 on loan from the Dextra Musica Foundation. She also plays the Hardanger Fiddle.

Discography 
 2011: Eldbjørg Hemsing, Kvarts, Ragnhild Hemsing, Varde (Kvarts)
 2018: Eldbjørg Hemsing, Wiener Symphoniker, Olari Elts: Hjalmar Borgstrøm, Violin Concerto op. 25/Shostakovich, Violin Concerto No. 1 (BIS)
 2018: Eldbjørg Hemsing, Antwerp Symphony Orchestra, Alan Buribayev: Dvořák & Suk, Works for Violin & Orchestra (BIS) 
 2019: Eldbjørg Hemsing, Oslo Philharmonic: Tan Dun, Fire Ritual, Violin Concertos (BIS)

Competitions and awards 
Hemsing received third prize in Eurovision Young Musicians 2008.

References

External links
 
 Eldbjørg Hemsing – Keynote Artist Management
 Barratt Due Musikkinstitut
The Hemsing Festival

Norwegian classical violinists
Eurovision Young Musicians Finalists
Barratt Due Institute of Music alumni
People from Valdres
1990 births
Living people
21st-century classical violinists
Women classical violinists
21st-century women musicians
People from Nord-Aurdal